Kurshiyevskaya is a rural locality (a village) in Tiginskoye Rural Settlement, Vozhegodsky District, Vologda Oblast, Russia. The population was 70 as of 2002.

Geography 
Kurshiyevskaya is located 39 km northwest of Vozhega (the district's administrative centre) by road. Ogibalovo is the nearest rural locality.

References 

Rural localities in Vozhegodsky District